Mount Colosseum is a national park in Central Queensland, Australia,  northwest of Brisbane and about  south of the town of Miriam Vale.

Mount Colosseum is a volcanic dome and is the dominant feature on the skyline of the area.

The park is undeveloped and has no facilities available for visitors. No camping is allowed in the park and no walking tracks exist within the park.

See also

 Protected areas of Queensland

References 

National parks of Central Queensland
Protected areas established in 1977